Trick or Treat is a 1991 album by Irish singer/songwriter Paul Brady, his sixth solo album, and his first for a major label. Mercury Records, teamed him with producer Gary Katz, who recruited from his contacts, including Toto members Jeff Porcaro - in his last project before his death - and David Paich. The title track is a duet with Bonnie Raitt. The album includes the successful song "Nobody Knows", later the title of an anthology.

Track listing
All songs written by Paul Brady
Soul Child - 5:41 
Blue World - 5:36   
Nobody Knows - 4:43 
Can't Stop Wanting You - 4:59 
You and I - 4:35   
Trick or Treat - 5:03  
Don't Keep Pretending - 4:59  
Solid Love - 4:34  
Love Goes On - 5:05  
Dreams Will Come - 6:06

Personnel
Paul Brady - vocals, mandolin, piano, keyboards, tin whistle, percussion, drum programming, acoustic and electric guitar
Michael Landau - electric guitar, lead guitar, rhythm guitar
David Paitch - keyboards, piano
Jeff Porcaro - drums, percussion
Freddie Washington - bass 
Jimmy Johnson - bass (5)
Elliott Randall - lead guitar (6), guitar (7, 10)
Bonnie Raitt - lead and backing vocals (6)
Backing Vocals – Curtis King, Fonsie Thornton, Frank Lloyd (5), Paul Brady

Technical
Producer – Gary Katz
Recorded by – Wayne Yurgelun
Mastered By – Bob Ludwig

References

External links
 Trick or Treat on  Amazon

1991 albums
Paul Brady albums
Albums produced by Gary Katz
Fontana Records albums